Visioo-writer - The OpenDocument file viewer is a computer program designed to run on multiple operating systems with the explicit ability to view OpenDocument and OpenOffice.org/StarOffice documents. It is currently in a stable state (version 0.6) but updates continue. The goal is to create a small application to open popular and free document formats (e.g., AbiWord, KWord).  The software is open-source, and written in Python.  Downloads are available for Microsoft Windows and Linux.

External links 
 Website

OpenDocument
Python (programming language) software